Reed Alexander (born September 30, 1987) is a former professional Canadian football offensive lineman for the Montreal Alouettes of the Canadian Football League. He was drafted 31st overall by the Alouettes in the 2011 CFL Draft, but elected to return to the Calgary Dinos for his fourth year.

References 

1987 births
Living people
Calgary Dinos football players
Canadian football offensive linemen
Sportspeople from Medicine Hat
Players of Canadian football from Alberta
Montreal Alouettes players